Tsarigrad Peak is sharp ice-covered peak rising to 1760 m in Imeon Range, Smith Island in the South Shetland Islands, Antarctica.  Overlooking Armira Glacier to the southeast.

The peak is named after the 1876 Constantinople Conference (Tsarigrad is the Bulgarian name for Constantinople) of the Great Powers that determined the Bulgarian ethnic borders as of the second half of the 19th century.

Location
Bulgarian mapping in 2009.

Maps
Chart of South Shetland including Coronation Island, &c. from the exploration of the sloop Dove in the years 1821 and 1822 by George Powell Commander of the same. Scale ca. 1:200000. London: Laurie, 1822.
  L.L. Ivanov. Antarctica: Livingston Island and Greenwich, Robert, Snow and Smith Islands. Scale 1:120000 topographic map. Troyan: Manfred Wörner Foundation, 2010.  (First edition 2009. )
 South Shetland Islands: Smith and Low Islands. Scale 1:150000 topographic map No. 13677. British Antarctic Survey, 2009.
 Antarctic Digital Database (ADD). Scale 1:250000 topographic map of Antarctica. Scientific Committee on Antarctic Research (SCAR). Since 1993, regularly upgraded and updated.
 L.L. Ivanov. Antarctica: Livingston Island and Smith Island. Scale 1:100000 topographic map. Manfred Wörner Foundation, 2017.

References
 Tsarigrad Peak. SCAR Composite Gazetteer of Antarctica.
 Bulgarian Antarctic Gazetteer. Antarctic Place-names Commission. (details in Bulgarian, basic data in English)

External links
 Tsarigrad Peak. Copernix satellite image

Mountains of Smith Island (South Shetland Islands)
Bulgaria and the Antarctic